Walter Allman House is a historic home located at Crown Point, Lake County, Indiana.  It was built in 1902, and is a three-story, Shingle style frame dwelling sheathed in horizontal clapboard shingles.  It sits on a limestone foundation and has a central brick chimney. It features an imposing gambrel roof and wraparound porch.

It was listed in the National Register of Historic Places in 2010.

References

Houses on the National Register of Historic Places in Indiana
Shingle Style architecture in Indiana
Houses completed in 1902
Buildings and structures in Lake County, Indiana
National Register of Historic Places in Lake County, Indiana
1902 establishments in Indiana